Reis Ashraf (born 18 September 1989) is an English-born Pakistani international footballer.

Career
Ashraf was a junior at Newport Pagnell Town before joining Coventry City in 2002. He later played for Leamington  and Olney Town.

Ashraf played for Pakistan in all three of his country's group matches against Bangladesh, Sri Lanka and Bhutan in the SAFF Championship 2009 in Bangladesh, scoring in the team's 7–0 victory over Bhutan.

References

External links

1989 births
Living people
English people of Pakistani descent
British Asian footballers
Welsh footballers
English footballers
Association football forwards
Pakistani footballers
Pakistan international footballers
People from Newport Pagnell
British sportspeople of Pakistani descent
Newport Pagnell Town F.C. players
Leamington F.C. players
Buckingham Town F.C. players
Bedford Town F.C. players
Olney Town F.C. players
Coventry City F.C. players